Nicholas Fletcher (born August 10, 1954) is an American football coach and former player. He served as the head football coach at  Eureka College in Eureka, Illinois from 1995 to 1999 and Denison University in Granville, Ohio from 2000 to 2009, compiling a career college football coaching record of 63–86.

Playing career
Fletcher played college football at Johns Hopkins University in Baltimore, Maryland from 1973 until 1975.

Coaching career
Fletcher was the offensive coordinator at Siena College in Loudonville, New York, where he coached Reggie Greene who was NCAA Division I-AA's all-time leading rusher at the time of his graduation.

Eureka
Fletcher was the 15th head football coach at Eureka College in Eureka, Illinois, serving for five seasons, from 1995 to 1999, and compiling a record of  27–22. His 1995 Eureka team was second in the nation in total offense and passing offense, amassing a 9–1 record. The 1995 team was later inducted into the Eureka College Hall of Fame. At Eureka, Fletcher coached Kurt Barth, who was the all-time leading receiver in NCAA Division III at the time of his graduation.

Denison
Fletcher was the head football coach at Denison University in Granville, Ohio from 2000 to 2009, tallying mark of 36–64 in ten seasons. Fletcher's teams produced 39 all-time Denison offensive records and had the best finish, third place, for Denison in the North Coast Athletic Conference (NCAC). Fletcher coached Denison's all-time leading career passer, Larry Cappetto, and single-season passing record holder, Greg Neuendorf. He also coached Denisons top two all-time leading receivers, Josh Jirgens and Ryan Hite, as well as three of Denisons all-time leading rushers, Phil Bouwhuis, Jon Berg and Fred Lee.

Fletcher was fired following the 2009 season and was replaced by Jack Hatem.

Head coaching record

College

References

1954 births
Living people
Denison Big Red football coaches
Eureka Red Devils football coaches
Johns Hopkins Blue Jays football players
Siena Saints football coaches
High school football coaches in New York (state)